Lac-des-Écorces Water Aerodrome  is located on Lac-des-Écorces, Quebec, Canada. It is open from May until mid-November.

References

Registered aerodromes in Laurentides
Seaplane bases in Quebec